Gerdo Hazelhekke (born 28 February 1950 in Utrecht) is a retired football player who played as a forward during his professional football career. He is a two-time topscorer of the Dutch Eerste Divisie.

References
 VI Profile

1950 births
Living people
Dutch footballers
Association football forwards
Eredivisie players
Eerste Divisie players
NEC Nijmegen players
Go Ahead Eagles players
De Graafschap players
FC Wageningen players
Footballers from Utrecht (city)